Heart of Ice may refer to:

 Heart of Ice (fairy tale), a fairy tale compiled in Andrew Lang's Green Fairy Book
 "Heart of Ice" (Batman: The Animated Series), an episode in the first season
 A two-part episode of Yu-Gi-Oh! GX: Heart of Ice, Part 1 and Heart of Ice, Part 2
 An alternative name for the Irish pop group Luv Bug